Four Quail-class destroyers served with the Royal Navy. These ships were all built by Laird, Son & Co. and were the first of the 'thirty knotters'.

Concern about the higher speeds of foreign boats had prompted to Admiralty to order new destroyers capable of 30 knots, rather than the 27 knot requirement which had been standard.  The boats were not able to make this speed in bad weather, where they were usually wet and uncomfortable with cramped crew quarters, but they proved their toughness in serving through the Great War, despite being twenty years old.  Thanks to their watertight bulkheads, their thin plating and light structure they were able to take a great deal of damage and remain afloat, although their plates buckled easily, affecting their handling.

The ships were fitted with Normand boilers which generated around 6,300 HP.  They were armed with the standard twelve pounder and two torpedo tubes and carried a complement of 63 officers and men.

In 1913 the Quail class (with the exception of Sparrowhawk lost in 1904), along with all other surviving "30 knotter" vessels with 4 funnels, were classified by the Admiralty as the B-class to provide some system to the naming of HM destroyers (at the same time, the 3-funnelled, "30 knotters" became the C-class and the 2-funnelled ships the D-class).

Ships
 , launched 24 September 1895, sold for disposal 23 July 1919.
 , launched 8 October 1895, wrecked 17 June 1904.
 , launched 5 November 1895, sold for disposal 1919.
 , launched 19 November 1895, sold for disposal 10 October 1919.

References

Bibliography

 

Destroyer classes
 
Ship classes of the Royal Navy